A shack (or, in some areas, shanty) is a type of small shelter or dwelling, often primitive or rudimentary in design and construction. 

Unlike huts, shacks are constructed by hand using available materials; however, whereas huts are usually rural and made of natural materials (mud, rocks, sticks, etc.) shacks are generally composed of scavenged man-made materials like abandoned construction debris, repurposed consumer waste and other useful discarded objects that can be quickly acquired at little or no cost and fashioned into a small dwelling.

Background
In areas of high population density and high poverty, shacks are often the most prevalent form of housing; it is possible that up to a billion people worldwide live in shacks. Fire is a significant hazard in tight-knit shack settlements. Settlements composed mostly or entirely of shacks are known as slums or shanty towns.

In Australian English shack can also refer to a small holiday house with limited conveniences, for instance it may not have running water or electricity.

In Canadian oilfield drilling, a shack can also be the word for a wellsite trailer. These structures are notorious among oilfield workers for being cramped, uncomfortable and generally unpleasant to be in.

In the 19th and early 20th centuries, tar paper shacks consisting of wooden frames covered with tar paper were a common form of very low-cost housing in the rural United States and Canada.

Gallery

See also 
 Radio shack
 Beach hut
 Log cabin
 Log house
 Hunting lodge
 Mountain lodge
 Sweat lodge
 Tipi

References

House types

es:Cabaña